"Come To Me" is a song by Ghanaian-born artist Sarkodie. It was released on September 8, 2017,  on iTunes by Sarkcess Music. The song, produced by Jayso, features vocals from UK artist, Bobii Lewis. The song is off Sarkodie's fifth studio album Highest.

Music video
The music video for "Come To Me" was released via Sarkodie's YouTube account on September 8, 2017, and has over 200,000 views.

Accolades

References

External links 

2017 songs
2017 singles
Hip hop songs
Ghanaian songs